HMS York was the lead ship of her class of two heavy cruisers built for the Royal Navy in the late 1920s. She mostly served on the North America and West Indies Station before World War II. Early in the war the ship escorted convoys in the Atlantic and participated in the Norwegian Campaign in 1940. York was transferred to the Mediterranean theatre in late 1940 where she escorted convoys and the larger ships of the Mediterranean Fleet. She was wrecked in an attack by Italian explosive motorboats of the 10th Flotilla MAS at Suda Bay, Crete, in March 1941. The ship's wreck was salvaged in 1952 and scrapped in Bari.

Design and description

Yorks design was based on the earlier County classes but was intended to be smaller and cheaper, although better armoured. She was easily distinguishable from her sister ship, as the latter had straight masts and funnels, while those of York were angled to the rear. In addition, York also had a very tall bridge designed to clear the aircraft catapult originally planned to be carried on the superfiring ('B') gun turret forward.

Steam for the turbines was provided by eight Admiralty 3-drum water-tube boilers. The ship's complement was 628 officers and men.

The ship mounted six 50-calibre 8-inch (203 mm) guns in three twin turrets. Her secondary armament consisted of four QF  Mk V anti-aircraft (AA) guns in single mounts. York mounted two single 2-pounder (40 mm) light AA guns ("pom-poms"). The ship carried two triple torpedo tube above-water mounts for  torpedoes.

York lacked a full waterline armor belt. The top and ends of the magazines were three inches thick. Space and weight was reserved for one catapult and its seaplane, but they were not fitted until after she was completed. A second catapult, intended to be mounted on 'B' turret, was deleted from the design during construction.

Service

York was laid down by Palmers Shipbuilding and Iron Company, Jarrow, on 18 May 1927, launched on 17 July 1928 and was completed on 1 May 1930. She became the flagship of Vice-Admiral Sir Reginald Drax, then his successor, Vice-Admiral Matthew R. Best, of the 2nd Cruiser Squadron of the Home Fleet upon commissioning. Between 1931 and 1934 she was commanded by Captain Richard Bevan, who was succeeded in Bermuda by Captain H.P. Boxer. The ship played a primary role in the Jubilee Day celebrations of the Silver Jubilee of George V that took place in the City of Hamilton, Bermuda, on the 6 May 1935. She was brought in through the channel to berth with special precautions at the Royal Naval Dockyard during the hurricane that struck Bermuda on 30 November 1935 when winds speeds reached 86 miles per hour (the Dockyard had been extensively damaged during a hurricane in October 1926, which had also sunk the sloop  with the loss of 85 of her crew). York was detached to the Mediterranean Fleet in 1935 and 1936 for the Second Italo-Abyssinian War, before returning to the American Station until the outbreak of war in September 1939.

The ship was transferred to Halifax, Nova Scotia that same month for convoy escort duties (as the circumference of the perimeter of one large convoy was relatively smaller for its area than those of two smaller convoys, requiring fewer escort vessels, convoys originating at Bermuda and Halifax, coded BHX and HX respectively, merged prior to crossing the Atlantic as HX convoys, often with only a single escort early in the war, as was the case with the ill-fated Convoy HX 84). In October 1939, York was assigned to Force F at Halifax, which was active in hunting for commerce raiders and protecting convoys. She was briefly refitted in Bermuda between 31 October and 22 November before she returned to Great Britain for a more thorough refit in December. Upon its completion on 9 February York was assigned to the 1st Cruiser Squadron of Home Fleet. On 3 March 1940 the ship intercepted the German blockade runner Arucas in the Denmark Strait near Iceland, but she was scuttled by her own crew before she could be captured.

In early April 1940, York, and the rest of her squadron, were assigned to carry troops under Plan R 4, the British plan to invade Norway. The troops were disembarked on 8 April when the British learned of the imminent German invasion of Norway and the squadron, under the command of Vice-Admiral John Cunningham, joined the bulk of the Home Fleet already at sea. On 10 April the destroyer  was badly damaged by air attack and York was detailed to tow her to Lerwick for repairs. York returned home on 26 April. York was one of the ships used to evacuate British and French troops from Namsos, along with three French transports and a number of British destroyers, on the evening of 1/2 May.

In the Mediterranean

In August 1940 York was assigned to the Mediterranean Fleet, joining the 3rd Cruiser Squadron in Alexandria in late September, after escorting a convoy around the Cape of Good Hope. During the Battle of Cape Passero, York sank the disabled and abandoned destroyer  on 13 October after the destroyer's engagement with the light cruiser  the previous evening. A month later York and the Mediterranean Fleet executed Operation MB8, a complex series of manoeuvers, including Operation Judgment, where the ship escorted the aircraft carrier  as her aircraft attacked the Italian Fleet at Taranto on the evening of 11/12 November. A few days later York ferried British troops from Alexandria, Egypt, to Piraeus, Greece. On 26 November, York, and the rest of the 3rd Cruiser Squadron, covered a small convoy to Malta.

The Mediterranean Fleet, including York, sortied on 16 December to conduct air strikes on Italian shipping, airbases on Rhodes and to bombard Valona. In early January 1941 the ship escorted the tanker  and four s to Suda Bay, Crete, and covered operations in the Eastern Mediterranean during Operation Excess. She arrived back at Alexandria on 16 January. York returned to Suda Bay in early February for operations against Italian shipping. During Operation Lustre in March, she protected troop convoys from Egypt to Greece.

Sinking

Six motorboats entered the bay, led by Tenente di vascello Luigi Faggioni, and attacked three targets in pairs; the first was York, second the tanker Pericles and last another ship at anchor. Three of the attacking boats had various problems, either mechanical or human, due to the extreme temperature conditions, but the other three successfully attacked their targets. Two motorboats, packed with  charges in the bows, struck York amidships, flooding both boiler rooms and one engine room. Two British seamen were killed. All Italian sailors survived the attack and fell into British hands. The ship was run aground to prevent her from sinking. The submarine  was used to supply electrical power to operate the cruiser's guns for anti-aircraft defence, until Rover was severely damaged by air attack and had to be towed away for repairs. On 18 May, further damage was inflicted by German bombers and the ship was damaged beyond repair. Her main guns were wrecked by demolition charges on 22 May 1941 when the Allies began to evacuate Crete. Yorks wreck was salvaged in February 1952 by an Italian shipbreaker and towed to Bari to be broken up, beginning on 3 March.

Footnotes

References

External links

HMS York at naval histories
WWII cruisers
HMS York at Uboat.net

 

York-class cruisers
Ships built on the River Tyne
1928 ships
World War II cruisers of the United Kingdom
World War II shipwrecks in the Mediterranean Sea
Maritime incidents in March 1941
Maritime incidents in May 1941